The Council Muslim League was a faction of the Pakistan Muslim League that divided from the Convention Muslim League that was supportive of the military regime of the President of Pakistan Gen. Ayub Khan. Sardar Muhammad Zafarullah, Mian Mumtaz Daultana, Sardar Shauket Hyat-Khan, Chaudhry Muhammad Husain Chattha, Khawaja Muhammad Safdar and Chaudhry Zahoor Elahi were prominent leaders of the Council Muslim League.

References

Islamic political parties in Pakistan
Muslim League
Political parties established in 1962
1962 establishments in Pakistan
Defunct political parties in Pakistan
Political parties with year of disestablishment missing
Muslim League breakaway groups